Stöð 2 Sport is an Icelandic television channel that broadcast a wide variety of different sports in Iceland. Stöð 2 Sport is only broadcast in Iceland and only in Icelandic.

Sports shown

Stöð 2 Sport offers a wide variety of live sports to choose from including most broadcast list first.

 Basketball Men's Domino's League, Women's Domino's League, NBA and Spanish Liga ACB
 Boxing World Championship boxing
 Football, UEFA Champions League, UEFA Cup, Spanish La Liga, English FA Cup, English League Cup, Icelandic Premier League, Icelandic National Team away games, all English National Team games and other top international matches.
 Golf, PGA Tour, European Tour, The Ryder Cup, US Open, The Masters, Players Championship, Icelandic Tour.
 Handball European Champions League and German Bundesliga
 Poker Poker After Dark, World Poker Tour and World Series of Poker
 Motocross
 NFL
 Tennis Wimbledon
 UFC Ultimate Fighting Championship

Football matches

Stöð 2 Sport shows football matches from a variety of different leagues and tournaments including the

  Champions League (UEFA)
  La Liga
  Copa América (CONMEBOL)
  FA Cup (FA)
  League Cup (EFL)
  European Qualifiers (UEFA) 
  Pepsi deildin (KSI)
  Europa League (UEFA)
  Super Cup (UEFA)
  International friendlies
  Premier League
  Serie A (FIGC)
  World Cup (FIFA)

Additional Channels
Stöð 2 Sport provide additional channels for when multiple events are ongoing, these are:
Stöð 2 Sport 2 HD
Stöð 2 Sport 3 HD
Stöð 2 Sport 4 HD
Stöð 2 Sport 5
Stöð 2 Sport 6

References

External links
 Official Site

Television channels in Iceland
Television channels and stations established in 2010